Warne Marsh Quintet: Jazz Exchange Vol. 2, is a live album by saxophonists Warne Marsh and Lee Konitz  which was recorded at the Jazzhus Montmartre in late 1975 and released on the Dutch Storyville label.

Reception 

The Allmusic review stated "In December 1975, tenor saxophonist Warne Marsh and altoist Lee Konitz went on a European tour. Their musical reunion showed that the magic that had existed between them a quarter-century before when they teamed up with their teacher Lennie Tristano was still very much present. Both saxophonists had grown through the years, and on this second of three sets, they are in consistently inventive form".

Track listing 
 "Kary's Trance" (Lee Konitz) – 6:08
 "Foolin' Myself" (Jack Lawrence, Peter Tinturin) – 5:52
 "Sound-Lee" (Konitz) – 8:09
 "Two-Part Invention No. 1 Allegro" (Johann Sebastian Bach) – 1:10
 "Two Not One" (Lennie Tristano) – 7:05
 "Darn That Dream" (Jimmy Van Heusen, Eddie DeLange) – 5:03
 "317 East 32nd Street" (Tristano) – 8:17
 "Two-Part Invention No. 13 Allegro Tranquillo" (Bach) – 1:19
 "April" (Tristano) – 9:13 Bonus track on CD reissue
 "Everything Happens to Me" (Matt Dennis, Tom Adair) – 5:06 Bonus track on CD reissue

Personnel 
Warne Marsh – tenor saxophone
Lee Konitz – alto saxophone
Dave Cliff – guitar
Peter Ind – bass
Al Levitt – drums

References 

Warne Marsh live albums
Lee Konitz live albums
1977 live albums
Storyville Records live albums